

Events

Births

Deaths
 Pietro della Vigna (born 1190), Italian jurist, diplomat, poet, and sonneteer of the Sicilian School, by suicide

13th-century poetry
Poetry